The 1990 Chinese census, officially the Fourth National Population Census of the People's Republic of China, was conducted by the National Bureau of Statistics of the People's Republic of China. Based on the fourth census of July 1990, mainland China's population was estimated to be 1.133 billion. According to the 1990 census, there were 56 ethnic nationalities with a total population of 1,133 billion. Among them, the Han Chinese had a population of 1.042 billion (94% of overall population).

See also
Census in China

References

External links 
 
 
 
 
 

1990
1990 in China
China